The Ismael Montes Teacher Training College (Escuela Superior de Formación de Maestros "Ismael Montes" or ESFM "Ismael Montes") is an institution of public higher education under the authority of the Ministry of Education of Bolivia, also known as Normal de Vacas.

Its facilities are situated in Challwa Mayu, Vacas Municipality, Arani Province, Cochabamba Department, about 1 km north west of Vacas.

One distinctive feature of this institution is that it prepares bilingual, Quechua and Spanish speaking teachers, for primary as well as for secondary education.

See also 
 Ismael Montes

References 

Education in Bolivia
Buildings and structures in Cochabamba Department
Education in Cochabamba Department
Educational institutions established in 1916
1916 establishments in Bolivia